Hubelmatt Observatory is an astronomical observatory in Lucerne, Switzerland, billeted at the city's Hubelmatt West School. Built in 1979, it is operated by the Astronomical Society of Lucerne.

On 12 February 2017, the inner main-belt asteroid 6126 Hubelmatt, discovered by Zdeňka Vávrová at Kleť Observatory, was named in honor of the observatory and its hosting school.. This was an additional reward for suggesting the winning names "Helvetios" and "Dimidium" for 51 Pegasi and its exoplanet, respectively, as part of the 2015 NameExoWorlds contest.

References

External links 
 Sternwarte Hubelmatt, homepage 
 Swiss Astronomical Society – Hubelmatt Observatory 
 17 Minor Planets Named by NameExoWorlds Contest Winners, International Astronomical Union

Hubelmatt
Buildings and structures in Lucerne